Phil Burrows may refer to:

 Phil Burrows (field hockey) (born 1980), New Zealand field hockey player
 Phil Burrows (footballer) (born 1946), English footballer